Goldilocks and the Three Dinosaurs is the title of a children's picture book by Mo Willems. Published in 2012 by Balzer and Bray, it is a parody of the traditional tale of "Goldilocks and The Three Bears" but the bears are replaced with Dinosaurs.

Reception
Kirkus Book Reviews called it "Top-notch for group storytime, for a project on revising classics or just for enjoyment; funniest for kids who know the original." A review from Publishers Weekly praised the book's humour and commented that it is "a sure bet for audiences who have moved beyond more gently witty fare". Regan McMahon, reviewing from Common Sense Media, stated that the book is an "exceptional delight" with an art style that included "sly elements to entertain adults".

References

2012 children's books
American picture books
Children's novels about dinosaurs
Balzer + Bray books